Navid Zanganeh is an Iranian wrestler and former member of the Iranian U-23 freestyle wrestling team.

Wrestling career 
Zanganeh wrestled for club Atrak Khorasan and represented Iran on the world stage.

During the 2018 Senior U23 World Championships in Bucharest Zanganeh earned a bronze medal after defeating Azerbaijani wrestler Ismail Abdullaev.

At the 2019 U-23 Senior Asian Championships Zanganeh won a silver medal after beating opponents from Kyrgyzstan, Turkmenistan, and Kazakhstan before facing defeat in the finals.

The Takhti freestyle wrestling tournament took place on 7 and 8 Feb. 2019 with representatives from Azerbaijan, Turkey, Russia, Armenia, Hungary, the Netherlands, Belarus, Kyrgyzstan and Georgia.  Zanganeh placed third and was a part of Iran's overall victory in the tournament.

Arrest and asylum 
Zanganeh was shot at anti-government rally in Tehran and was subsequently arrested after being taken to hospital.  He was detained for 15 days and was eventually released from Fashafaviye prison. Zanganeh was immediately released from his club Atrak Khorasan and was unable to wrestle for Iran. After the arrest was made public, Zanganeh emigrated to Canada and hopes to resume his wrestling career representing Canada.

Mixed martial arts career 

Navid began his MMA career in Vancouver, Canada. His head coach is currently Dan Golkar out of Scorpion MMA in Pitt Meadows, British Columbia.

References 

Iranian male sport wrestlers
Living people
1996 births
People from Tehran Province